JSC NPO Almaz named after A.A. Raspletin (former SB-1, 1947–50; KB-1, 1950–66; MKB Strela, 1966–71; TsKB Almaz, 1971–88; NPO Almaz, 1988–2008; GSKB Almaz-Antey, 2008–15) is a Soviet/Russian military R&D enterprise founded in 1947. It is the core of the Almaz-Antey holding. Headquarters – Moscow, Leningradsky av., 80.

History
The company is named after its chief designer .

Since 1955, KB-1 developed such air defence missile systems as the S-25 Berkut, S-75 Dvina, S-125 Neva/Pechora, S-200 Angara/Vega/Dubna, S-300, S-400 Triumf, S-300PMU, S-300PMU2, and S-350E Vityaz.

On 30 November 2009, the board of directors of Almaz-Antey voted to reorganize the joint-stock companies NIEMI, NIIRP, MNIIRE Altair and MNIIPA, merging them with NPO Almaz to form GSKB joint venture. GSKB became the head R&D arm of Almaz-Antey holdings, becoming its Head System Design Bureau.

NIIRP scientific & research center is developing the Joint system of air and ballistic missile defense. Earlier, NIIRP successfully developed the A-135 BMD system together with Amur-P multi-channel firing system which were put into operation to protect Moscow on 17 February 1995. NIIRP had previously designed the A-35 and A-35M BMD systems, which defended Moscow from 1977 until the full deployment of the A-135.

In February 2011, it was announced that the first S-500 missile systems should be in serial production by 2014. There will be also a version of the system called S-1000.

Current product line 
 Area and object air defence
 S-125 Neva/Pechora
 S-400 Triumf missile system
 S-300PMU2 Favorit missile system
 S-300P missile system and modifications
 Land forces air defence (by NIEMI scientific & research center)
 Antey-2500 missile system
 S-300V missile system
 Tor-M2E short-range missile system
 55Zh6M Nebo M and UME three-band anti-stealth radar
 Ship-based air defence (by MNIIRE Altair scientific & research center)
 Shtil-1 multi-channel ship-based middle-range missile system
 S-300F Rif-M ship-based missile system
 Klinok ship-based missile system
 3M-47 Gibka, the ship turret launcher
 Podzagolovok-24E – Basic Collective Mutual Interference Avoidance System (ship-based electromagnetic compatibility electronic equipment)
 Moskit-E, Moskit-MVE missile system
 Automated control systems (by MNIIPA scientific & research center)
 Baikal-1ME
 Krim-KTE
 Universal-1E
 Fundament-2E

References

External links 

 Official site of GSKB Almaz-Antey 
 Official site of Almaz-Antey 
 NPO Almaz at Globalsecurity.org

1947 establishments in Russia
Defence companies of the Soviet Union
Research institutes in the Soviet Union
Almaz-Antey
Technology companies established in 1947
Companies based in Moscow
Ministry of Radio Industry (Soviet Union)
Electronics companies of the Soviet Union
Design bureaus